North West London Credit Union Limited was a savings and loans co-operative, operating in the north west London boroughs of Barnet and Brent. Based in Grahame Park, it had over 1,000 members and branches in Burnt Oak, Edgware, and Finchley. In 2013, it merged with London Capital Credit Union and the branches were closed.

History

The credit union was founded in 1998, as the Watling and Grahame Park Credit Union, by residents of the suburbs of Burnt Oak and Colindale. In 2010, it merged with Barnet Council Employees Credit Union (established 1996) and Finchley Credit Union (established 2000), changing its name the same year.

A member of the Association of British Credit Unions Limited, registered under the Industrial and Provident Societies Acts, North West London Credit Union was authorised by the Prudential Regulation Authority and regulated by the Financial Conduct Authority and PRA. Ultimately, like the banks and building societies, members’ savings were protected against business failure by the Financial Services Compensation Scheme.

In 2012, the directors approached London Capital Credit Union, whose origins in Islington mirrored Barnet Council Employees Credit Union, with a view to merger. After 15 years independent trading, the credit union transferred engagements to its larger neighbour in 2013.

See also
Credit unions in the United Kingdom
British co-operative movement

References

External links
London Capital Credit Union
Association of British Credit Unions

Credit unions of the United Kingdom
Banks established in 1998
Banks disestablished in 2013